Franconia–Springfield is a Washington Metro rapid transit station and Virginia Railway Express commuter rail station located in Springfield, Virginia, United States. The station is the southwestern terminus of the Metro Blue Line and an intermediate station on the VRE Fredericksburg Line. It is also a major bus terminal for Fairfax Connector buses, plus other local and intercity bus routes. The station has one island-platform serving the two Metro tracks, plus two side platforms serving the RF&P Subdivision on which the Fredericksburg Line runs.

Located in a suburban area near I-95, the station is primarily used by commuters from more distant suburbs. Its parking garage is the largest on the Metro system, with 5,069 spaces. With 6,970 average daily riders by a May 2016 count, Franconia–Springfield was the 8th-most-used Metro station in Virginia.

The VRE stop opened in 1995, followed by the Metro station on June 29, 1997. From 2003 to 2010, the station was also served by Amtrak Northeast Regional intercity rail trains.

History

Prior to construction by WMATA, Franconia–Springfield station was the site of Franconia Station, a standard railroad station built by the Richmond, Fredericksburg and Potomac Railroad. It was built in 1870 and demolished in 1952. Original Metro plans called for separate stations for Franconia and Springfield, but before 1979 – due to the expense and complications of running separate branches – plans had changed to combine the two stations into one. In 1979 the "Franconia" station was renamed "Franconia-Springfield".

In 1981, WMATA held a series of public hearings to discuss issues related to the expansion of the then Yellow Line to Springfield by 1986, although the project was unfunded at that time. By 1987, the Northern Virginia Transportation Commission began to evaluate whether or not state funding would be necessary to complete the station as federal funding was not guaranteed at that time. By 1991, funding for the expansion was secured and plans for the station, parking garage, and other commuter facilities were approved by the Metro board.

The VRE platform opened in 1995, the second infill station on the system. The final cost for both the station and rail expansion was $175 million.

On October 10, 2003, due to increases in ridership on both the Metro and VRE lines, WMATA opened an additional parking garage on the premises for park-and-ride users, offering an additional 1,000 parking spaces, and bringing the total to 5,100 spaces.

On June 25, 2017, Yellow Line trains stopped serving the station due to the elimination of Rush+, which is part of major changes to the Metrorail system.

In May 2018, Metro announced an extensive renovation of platforms at twenty stations across the system. The Blue and Yellow Lines south of Ronald Reagan Washington National Airport station, including the Franconia–Springfield station, would be closed from May to September 2019. The platforms at this station would then be rebuilt starting in fall 2019.

Between September 10 and November 5, 2022, Franconia-Springfield was closed due to the Potomac Yard station tie-in, closing all stations south of Ronald Reagan Washington National Airport station. Shuttle buses were provided throughout the shutdown.

Station layout

Access to the station is provided by an elevated walkway connecting the parking garage and bus bays to the platforms. Blue Line trains stop at an island platform below the elevated walkway, with fare control on the same level as the walkway. VRE trains stop at two side platforms adjacent to the Metro tracks.

References

External links

 VRE: Franconia/Springfield Station
 The Schumin Web Transit Center: Franconia–Springfield Station
 USA Rail Guide: Franconia–Springfield Station

Former Amtrak stations in Virginia
Stations on the Blue Line (Washington Metro)
Bus stations in Virginia
Buildings and structures in Fairfax County, Virginia
Virginia Railway Express stations
Washington Metro stations in Virginia
Transportation in Fairfax County, Virginia
Railway stations in the United States opened in 1995
1995 establishments in Virginia